Mahiki is a London nightclub and bar in Dover Street, just off Piccadilly, near the Ritz Hotel, well known for its celebrity clientele.  It is named after the Polynesian path to the underworld. Mahiki was opened in October 2006 by Piers Adam and Nick House.  The club has attracted media attention as a favourite haunt of royals including Princes William and Harry and celebrities such as Rihanna, Lady Gaga, Kelly Rowland, and Paris Hilton. Its themed Thursday nights, hosted by Henry Conway, a socialite, were particularly popular, and rival club owner Charlie Gilkes has said "Thursday nights at Mahiki ... are the night in London, there are queues going round the block."

About the club

The club was opened at 1, Dover Street in 2006 (the site of an earlier nightclub) by Piers Adam, David Phelps and Nick House. Mahiki is a nightclub and bar, with a Polynesian and tiki theme, predominantly specialising in rum. Mahiki claims that it adheres to a mostly open door policy. Its co-founder Nick House has said "The vision with Mahiki is that whether you're fat, thin, bald, ugly or old, you can get in. Admittedly, when it gets to 11pm, it might be more difficult. But certainly, until it reaches capacity, anyone can get in." Some papers have attributed its popularity with London's upper class in part to promotions manager Guy Pelly, who is a close friend of Princes William and Harry. For a time, Mahiki was managed by Jack Brooksbank, who later married Princess Eugenie.

The Mahiki brand

Other clubs 
A Mahiki club in Dubai, located at the Jumeirah Beach Hotel, opened in 2011 and closed in 2018, due to “unforeseen circumstances during the renovation” of the hotel, as stated by the owners at the time.

In 2017, Mahiki's owners further expanded and franchised the brand. There is also a Mahiki club in Gothenburg, Sweden.

Branded liquors 
In 2008, a line of three rum blends exclusively sold at Selfridges (not available anymore) was released under the Mahiki brand. Mahiki Coconut, the club's branded rum coconut liqueur, was first introduced in 2011. In 2017, it was relaunched with a new bottle design by fashion designer Henry Holland, as Mahiki Coconut Rum. The liqueur is described as „refined with Jamaican and Polynesian rum and rounded off with Samoan coconuts“. Later that year, Mahiki introduced three ready-to-drink canned cocktails adapted from cocktails on the Mahiki menu (Treasure Chest, Pina Colada and Coconut Grenade). For production of the beverage range, Mahiki partnered with Diageo; marketing and distribution were overseen by the UK drinks distributor Cellar Trends.

Since 2018, international production and packaging of the Mahiki beverage portfolio is managed by the German drinks distributor MBG Group.  For the UK, MBG has signed a new distribution agreement with Cellar Trends.

MBG has launched the Mahiki drinks range – with some changes in product design – on the German market, in Austria, the Netherlands, Switzerland, the United Arab Emirates and Spain in 2019. The original canned pre-mixes were replaced with the new products „Mahiki Coconut Pineapple Cocktail“ and „Mahiki Coconut Maracuja Cocktail“. In the six months period after the launch on the German retail market, more than 100.000 bottles of the rum liqueur have been sold. Later in 2019, a rum coconut liqueur with cream („Mahiki White Coconut“) was added to the Mahiki range. New pre-mixes („Mahiki White Coconut Pina Colada“ and „Mahiki White Coconut Cherry Coconut“) were introduced in June 2020.

Ownership 
The London Mahiki club is operated by Mahiki Ltd. (whose owners are Piers Adam and David Phelps). The Mahiki brand was originally registered to Taihiti Ltd. and is now owned by Tiki Brands Holding Ltd. (Piers Adam is listed as the owner of both companies.)

Since May 2019, Andreas Herb, the managing director of MBG, is the sole director of Tiki Brands Holding Ltd. A confirmation statement published in 2020 lists Piers Adam and MBG as the main shareholders of Tiki Brands Holding Ltd., with a 34,44 percent stake each.

References

External links
 Official website

Nightclubs in London
2006 establishments in England
Buildings and structures in the City of Westminster
Tourist attractions in the City of Westminster
Piccadilly
Liqueurs